Who Goes There is the debut solo album by Gomez singer and guitarist Ian Ball, released on October 30, 2007.

Track listing
"Sweet Sweet Sleep" - 5:14
"Automatic Message" - 3:26
"Failure" - 3:25
"Your Move" - 4:59
"The Elephant Pharmacy" - 3:53
"Free Tickets To The Moon" - 0:52
"Who Goes There" - 10:10
"When We Were Cool" - 2:43
"Batteries" - 1:26
"I Knew You Were Trouble" - 3:43
"Enzymes" - 5:26

Failure and Elephant Pharmacy both featured on Operation Aloha's self-titled debut album, for whom Ian Ball was lead vocalist.

References

2007 debut albums